Brimstone is a 2009 Western novel by Robert B. Parker.  It is the third novel featuring Everett Hitch and Virgil Cole and it follows the events of Appaloosa and Resolution.

External links
 Brimstone page at Parker's official site

Western (genre) novels
2009 American novels
Western United States in fiction
Novels by Robert B. Parker